The canton of Vaud is divided into 10 districts.

Several districts have been merged.

Some districts have been divided into cercles, e.g. Yverdon District was divided into the cercles of Molondin, Belmont-sur-Yverdon, Yverdon and Champvent.

There are ca. 400 municipalities in Vaud.

Districts 

The Canton of Vaud is divided into 10 districts:
Aigle with capital Aigle
Broye-Vully with capital Payerne
Gros-de-Vaud with capital Echallens
Jura-North Vaudois with capital Yverdon-les-Bains
Lausanne with capital Lausanne
Lavaux-Oron with capital Cully
Morges with capital Morges
Nyon with capital Nyon
Riviera-Pays-d'Enhaut with capital Vevey
Ouest lausannois with capital Renens

Former districts 

 Aubonne
 Avenches
 Cossonay
 Echallens
 Grandson
 La Vallée
 Lavaux
 Moudon
 Orbe
 Payerne
 Pays-d'Enhaut
 Rolle
 Vevey
 Yverdon